The Pădurea Craiului Mountains are in the northwestern part of the Apuseni Mountains of the Carpathian Mountain range, located between the  and the Beiuș Depression. The name Pădurea Craiului literally means "The Forest of the King".

External links

Mountain ranges of Romania
Mountain ranges of the Western Romanian Carpathians
Western Romanian Carpathians
Geography of Bihor County